Heidi Farsøe Bank (born 1 August 1972 in Hørsholm) is a Danish politician, who is a member of the Folketing for the Venstre political party. She was elected into the Folketing in the 2019 Danish general election. She has a background as a real estate agent.

Political career
Bank first ran for a political office in the 2017 Danish local elections, where she was a candidate for Venstre in Aarhus Municipality. She was elected member of the municipal council with 2,109 votes cast for her.

Bank was elected into parliament at the 2019 election, where she received 2,943 personal votes, securing a seat in the Folketing as a levelling seat.

External links 
 Biography on the website of the Danish Parliament (Folketinget)

References 

Living people
1972 births
People from Hørsholm Municipality
21st-century Danish women politicians
Women members of the Folketing
Venstre (Denmark) politicians
Aarhus municipal council members
Members of the Folketing 2019–2022